The 2020–21 Delaware Fightin' Blue Hens women's basketball team represented the University of Delaware during the 2020–21 NCAA Division I women's basketball season. The Fightin' Blue Hens, led by fourth year head coach Natasha Adair, played their home games at the Bob Carpenter Center and were members of the Colonial Athletic Association (CAA). They finished the regular season 19–3, 16–2 in CAA play to win their first conference regular season championship since 2013. They lost in the finals of the CAA women's tournament to Drexel. The team was given an automatic qualifier to the 2021 Women's National Invitation Tournament where they won the Charlotte Regional Championship by defeating Villanova. The team lost to eventual WNIT Champion Rice in the semifinals, marking Delaware's furthest advance in the tournament. The team received Top 25 votes in the Coaches Poll of the 2020–21 NCAA Division I women's basketball rankings in weeks 8, 9, 16, and 17.

Roster

Schedule

|-
!colspan=9 style=| Non-conference regular season

|-
!colspan=9 style=| CAA regular season

|-
!colspan=9 style=| CAA Women's Tournament

|-
!colspan=12 style=| WNIT

Awards and honors

 Jasmine Dickey received WNIT Charlotte All-Region Team and WNIT All-Tournament Team.
 Jasmine Dickey received CAA Player of the Year, First team All-CAA selection, CAA All-Defensive team, and CAA All-Tournament Team.
 Ty Battle received First team All-CAA selection, CAA All-Defensive team, and CAA All-Tournament Team.
 Natasha Adair received CAA Coach of the Year.

References

 
Delaware Fightin' Blue Hens women's basketball seasons